The Union Jack was the only monthly newspaper featuring news from the United Kingdom, produced and published in the United States. The publication is aimed at British expatriates in the United States. It was established in 1982 and is distributed in every state. The paper ceased publication in July 2016.

References 

Defunct newspapers published in California
Publications established in 1982
1982 establishments in California
Publications disestablished in 2016
Newspapers published in San Diego